Adenosine 3',5'-bisphosphate is a form of an adenosine nucleotide with two phosphate groups attached to different carbons in the ribose ring. This is distinct from adenosine diphosphate, where the two phosphate groups are attached in a chain to the 5' carbon atom in the ring.

Adenosine 3',5'-bisphosphate is produced as a product of sulfotransferase enzymes from the donation of a sulfate group from the coenzyme 3'-phosphoadenosine-5'-phosphosulfate. This product is then hydrolysed by 3'(2'),5'-bisphosphate nucleotidase to give adenosine monophosphate, which can then be recycled into adenosine triphosphate.

See also
 Adenine
 Sulfur metabolism
 Acetyl-CoA

References

Nucleotides
Sulfur metabolism